Ovidiu Covaciu (born 3 September 1990) is a Romanian professional footballer who plays as a midfielder for Gloria Bistrița-Năsăud. Covaciu debuted in Liga I for Gaz Metan Mediaș and played in Liga II for Dacia Unirea Brăila and in Liga III for teams such as: Arieșul Turda, Avântul Reghin, Metalurgistul Cugir or Unirea Jucu.

References

External links
 
 

1990 births
Living people
People from Mediaș
Romanian footballers
Romania youth international footballers
Association football midfielders
Liga I players
CS Gaz Metan Mediaș players
Liga II players
AFC Dacia Unirea Brăila players
Liga III players
ACS Sticla Arieșul Turda players
CS Gloria Bistrița-Năsăud footballers